Compsodecta is a genus of Caribbean jumping spiders that was first described by Eugène Louis Simon in 1903.

Species
 it contains eight species, found only in Jamaica and on the Greater Antilles:
Compsodecta darlingtoni (Bryant, 1950) – Jamaica
Compsodecta defloccata (Peckham & Peckham, 1901) – Jamaica
Compsodecta festiva (Bryant, 1950) – Jamaica
Compsodecta gratiosa (Bryant, 1950) – Jamaica
Compsodecta grisea (Peckham & Peckham, 1901) (type) – Jamaica
Compsodecta haytiensis (Banks, 1903) – Hispaniola
Compsodecta peckhami Bryant, 1943 – Hispaniola
Compsodecta valida (Bryant, 1950) – Jamaica

References

External links
 Diagnostic drawings of several species

Salticidae genera
Fauna of Jamaica
Salticidae
Spiders of the Caribbean